The 2007 Dwars door Vlaanderen was the 62nd edition of the Dwars door Vlaanderen cycle race and was held on 28 March 2007. The race started in Roeselare and finished in Waregem. The race was won by Tom Boonen.

General classification

References

2007
2007 in road cycling
2007 in Belgian sport
March 2007 sports events in Europe